Bilgaon is a village in the Dhadgaon Tehsil of Nandurbar district, in Maharashtra in western India. It consists of 12 hamlets. The population recorded in the 2011 Census of India was 1840.

Notably, a micro hydro was built in 2003 mostly with the help of voluntary labour by the tribals (Shramdaan); effects of the Sardar Sarovar Dam caused it to be washed away.

The  Bollywood film Swades was based on the village. Aadiwasi Janjagruti a community media based social project operated in Dhadgaon Tehsil is making a documentary on it

References 

Cities and towns in Nandurbar district
Talukas in Maharashtra
Nandurbar district